Alkhairaat ("good things") is the largest Islamic community organization in eastern Indonesia based in Palu, Central Sulawesi.

References

Footnotes

Bibliography

Further reading

External links

 Alkhairaat official website
 Alkhairaat
 Media Alkhairaat Online official website
 Alkhairaat University official website

Sunni Islamic movements
Islamic organizations based in Indonesia
1930 establishments in the Dutch East Indies
Islamic organizations established in 1930